Megalomys georginae is an extinct species of rice rat from Barbados, that belongs in the genus Megalomys. The species originated from the Late Pleistoscene era.

References

georginae
Taxa named by Marcelo Weksler